Jake Sheridan (born 8 July 1986) is an English football coach and former footballer  who is the assistant manager of Gainsborough Trinity.

As a player he was a midfielder who notably played professionally for Notts County and Lincoln City. He also played in Non-League football for Dunkirk, Tamworth, Eastwood Town, Alfreton Town, Boston United and Basford United.

Playing career

Notts County
Born in Nottingham, Nottinghamshire, Sheridan joined Notts County from Dunkirk on 5 August 2005. Sheridan, under the guidance of manager Gary Mills, made his debut for Notts County on 6 August 2005 in a scoreless away fixture against Torquay United. Just six days later he and teammate Stacy Long were offered one-year deals by County. During the 2005–06 season, Sheridan established himself as a regular in the team making 27 appearances and scored his only goal for the club in a 1–1 draw away to Wrexham. Sheridan agreed a new one-year deal at Meadow Lane on 22 May 2006.

The following season proved a little more difficult for Sheridan, with the midfielder only making a total of three league appearances, and finding himself on the wrong side of the retained list for the 2007–08 season.

Tamworth
On 2 July 2007, Sheridan teamed up with his former Notts County manager Gary Mills at Conference North side Tamworth, agreeing a one-year contract. In his first season with Tamworth, the club recorded a disappointing 15th-place finish in the Conference North, with Sheridan making 12 appearances and failing to find the net.

Sheridan signed a new one-year contract to remain at Tamworth for the 2008–09 season. Sheridan made 11 appearances and scored his first goal for the club in a home fixture against Southport, as Tamworth finished the season as league champions.

Following promotion to the Conference National, Sherdian was one of five players who agreed a new deal with The Lambs. He proved to be important member of the squad, and this showed as Sheridan made 23 appearances and had a very good season in front of goal, scoring five goals including a memorable winner in the 2–1 win at home to Wrexham on 25 August 2009.

After a successful season, Sheridan expressed interest in returning for 2010–11 season. He was granted his wish and was handed a further one-year extension. Sheridan again found himself a regular in the team, and went on to make 35 league appearances, and despite scoring only one goal all season, scored what proved to be the winner on the final day of the 2010–11 in a home fixture against Forest Green Rovers.

On 16 June 2011, Sheridan's hopes of another year with Tamworth were dashed, as new manager Marcus Law told him he was not part of his long-term plans for the club, bringing an end to his four-year stay with the club. Sheridan left the club along with Aaron Farrell, a few weeks prior to his contract expiring, in a bid to start looking for a new club for the 2011–12 season.

Eastwood Town
On 21 July 2011, Sheridan appeared in a pre-season friendly for Conference North side Eastwood Town in their 1–0 defeat against Wrexham.

Lincoln City
He was loaned out to Conference National side Lincoln City on 17 November 2011 until 1 January 2012, and made his debut nine days later, starting the game against Ebbsfleet United, a match Lincoln went on to win 3–0. He later signed a permanent deal with Lincoln.

Later career
After a successful campaign with the imps, Sheridan joined Alfreton Town on a one-year contract, following no new contract offer from Lincoln.

In 2015, Sheridan signed for Basford United. On 27 October 2016 he suffered a badly broken leg in a tie against Stamford.

Coaching career
Following his retirement, Sheridan was active on the coaching staff at both Basford United and Eastwood Town before being appointed assistant manager of Gainsborough Trinity on 22 April 2021.

Honours
Tamworth
Conference North: 2008–09

References

External links

1986 births
Living people
Footballers from Nottingham
English footballers
Association football midfielders
Dunkirk F.C. players
Notts County F.C. players
Tamworth F.C. players
Eastwood Town F.C. players
Lincoln City F.C. players
Alfreton Town F.C. players
Boston United F.C. players
Basford United F.C. players
English Football League players
National League (English football) players